The Edmonton Ice were a junior ice hockey team based in Edmonton, Alberta, Canada, that played two seasons in the Western Hockey League from 1996 to 1998.

History
The WHL expanded to Edmonton in 1996, and the Ice began play at the Northlands Agricom. On January 16, 1996, Dave Siciliano was announced as the first head coach for the Ice. He and team owner Ed Chynoweth, were committed to building a relationship between the Ice and the local minor ice hockey program. The Ice completed the 1996–97 season with 14 wins in 72 games, placed last overall in the league, and did not qualify for the playoffs. 

When the team began the 1997–98 season with nine losses and one tie, Siciliano was fired on October 24, 1997, and replaced by assistant coach Ryan McGill. During Siciliano's tenure, the Ice lost 31 games by a one-goal margin.

After two seasons, the team relocated to Cranbrook, British Columbia, and became the Kootenay Ice.  The team relocated a second time in 2019 and is currently known as the Winnipeg Ice.

Season-by-season record
Note: GP = Games played, W = Wins, L = Losses, T = Ties Pts = Points, GF = Goals for, GA = Goals against

NHL alumni

See also
List of ice hockey teams in Alberta
Edmonton Oil Kings
Edmonton Oil Kings (WCHL)

References

1996 establishments in Alberta
1998 disestablishments in Alberta
Defunct ice hockey teams in Alberta
Defunct Western Hockey League teams
Ice hockey clubs established in 1996
Ice